The Democratic Party of Right is a political party in Albania. It was established in 1994 as a split from the Democratic Party.

References

Political parties in Albania
1994 establishments in Albania
Political parties established in 1994